The 2014 Blancpain GT Series season was the first season of the Blancpain GT Series. The season started on 12 April at Monza and ended on 2 November in Baku. The season featured twelve rounds, five Blancpain Endurance Series rounds and seven Blancpain Sprint Series rounds.

Calendar

Entries

Race results

Championship standings
Scoring system
Championship points were awarded for the first six positions in each Qualifying Race and for the first ten positions in each Championship Race. Entries were required to complete 75% of the winning car's race distance in order to be classified and earn points. Individual drivers were required to participate for a minimum of 25 minutes in order to earn championship points in any race. There were no points awarded for the Pole Position.

Qualifying Race points

Championship Race points

24 Hours of Spa points
Points were awarded after six hours, after twelve hours and at the finish.

1000 km Nürburgring points

Drivers' Championship (Top 45)

Footnotes

Teams' Championship

See also
2014 Blancpain Endurance Series
2014 Blancpain Sprint Series

References

External links

GT World Challenge Europe
2014 in motorsport